Tambourine, Drum is a 2009 Russian drama film directed by Aleksey Mizgiryov.

Plot 
The film tells about the head of the library, Katya, who falls in love with a sailor who leaves her for her friend. As a result, Katya is ready to give the apartment to someone who kills her opponent.

Cast 
 Natalya Negoda as Katya
 Elena Lyadova as Friend
 Dmitriy Kulichkov as Sailor
 Sergey Neudachin as Igor
 Aleksandr Alyoshkin as Andrey
 Oleg Vasilkov as Ignat
 Eleonora Ilchenko	
 Liubomiras Laucevicius

References

External links 
 

2009 films
2000s Russian-language films
Russian drama films
2009 drama films